47th Street may refer to:

47th Street (Manhattan), in New York City
47th Street (Washington, D.C.)
47th Street (album), a 1997 album by jazz trumpeter Malachi Thompson

See also
47th Street station (disambiguation)
West 47th Street